Tatyana's Day is a 1967 Soviet drama film directed by Isidor Annensky.

Plot 
The film takes place in Petrograd. The film tells about the organization of the first working youth organization...

Cast 
 Lyudmila Maksakova as Tanya Ogneva
 Vladimir Tatosov as Yakov Mikhaylovich Sverdlov
 Anatoliy Antosevich as Antonov
 Valeriy Pogoreltsev as Vernik
 Dalvin Shcherbakov as Turnin
 Valentina Moldovanova as Irina
 Vladimir Kolokoltsev as Metyolkin
 Semyon Morozov as Semynin
 Aleksandr Martynov as Zernov

References

External links 
 

1967 films
1960s Russian-language films
Soviet drama films
1967 drama films